The 1st constituency of the Pas-de-Calais is a French legislative constituency in the Pas-de-Calais département.

Description

Pas-de-Calais' 1st constituency covers a large rural chunk of the southern part of the department along the border with Picardie.

In the 2010 redistricting of French legislative constituencies, Pas-de-Calais' 2nd constituency was enlarged  to include the entire of Arras having previously only contained the north of the city.
Jacqueline Maquet who was the deputy for the 1st constituency moved to the 2nd constituency in the 2012 election.

The seat was held by the left from 1988 to 2017.

Historic Representation

Election results

2022

 
 
 
 
 
 
 
|-
| colspan="8" bgcolor="#E9E9E9"|
|-

2017

2012

 
 
 
 
 
 
|-
| colspan="8" bgcolor="#E9E9E9"|
|-

2007

 
 
 
 
 
 
 
 
|-
| colspan="8" bgcolor="#E9E9E9"|
|-

2002

 
 
 
 
 
 
 
 
|-
| colspan="8" bgcolor="#E9E9E9"|
|-

1997

 
 
 
 
 
 
 
 
|-
| colspan="8" bgcolor="#E9E9E9"|
|-

Sources
 Official results of French elections from 1998: 

1